Admirável Chip Novo (English: Brave New Chip) is the debut album of Brazilian rock singer Pitty.

Themes and songwriting
Pitty is noted for her dark and complex songwriting. The opening track "Teto de Vidro" deals with the capitalistic society and the curiosity some have over other people's lives. "Admirável Chip Novo", "Máscara", "I Wanna Be", and "Só de Passagem" are about falsity and shallow behaviors. "O Lobo" throws back to Prehistory to criticize war and hatred among humankind. The other compositions deal with love, life, and ordinary actions and decisions.

Reception
Admirável Chip Novo was a very successful record. It sold more than 800,000 copies in Brazil, enough to be certified platinum (225,000 copies shipped). Unlike most Brazilian recording artists, who release an average of two or three singles per album, Pitty released no less than five singles from the album. These were (in order of release) "Máscara", "Admirável Chip Novo", "Teto de Vidro", "Equalize", e "Semana Que Vem". All the music videos for the songs were highly successful on MTV Brasil's Disk MTV, a correspondent to American MTV's TRL. A live recording of "O Lobo" also aired on the channel; a sixth single, "I Wanna Be", was also supposedly released, but never had a music video or received widespread radio airplay.

Track listing

References

2003 debut albums
Pitty albums